The SanBusCo Market Center, or SanBusCo Center, is an historic commercial building in Santa Fe, New Mexico

The SanBusCo Center was originally a Santa Fe Railroad commercial center, called Santa Fe Business Company, built before 1880.   The site was renovated in the 1980s and received National Historic status at that time. The SanBusCo Center is built in an industrial style.  It is surrounded by historic old adobe structures.  The unique design was preserved during the renovation in the 1980s.

The SanBusCo Center has shops, restaurants, and offices.  The site holds three world class restaurants, law offices, and unique retail establishments.  These include a pen shop purveyed by state lawmakers who work in the nearby State Capitol Building.  Documentary photography of the original building and historic text references the history of New Mexico.

References

External links 

National Register of Historic Places in Santa Fe, New Mexico